Stavru Teodorov (11 July 1931 – 2003) was a Romanian sprint canoer who competed in the late 1950s. He competed in two Summer Olympics; his best finish was fourth in the K-2 1000 m event at Melbourne in 1956.

References
Stavru Teodorov's profile at Sports Reference.com

External links
 

Canoeists at the 1956 Summer Olympics
Canoeists at the 1960 Summer Olympics
Olympic canoeists of Romania
Romanian male canoeists
1931 births
2003 deaths